Mildred Imoch Cleghorn (December 11, 1910 – April 15, 1997) was first chairperson of the Fort Sill Apache Tribe. Her Apache names were Eh-Ohn and Lay-a-Bet, and she was one of the last Chiricahua Apaches born under "prisoner of war" status. She was an educator and traditional doll maker, and was regarded as a cultural leader. She worked as a home extension agent and as a home economics teacher. She served as tribal chairperson from 1976 until 1995 and focused on sustaining history and traditional Chiricahua culture.

Mildred Cleghorn and her dolls were participants at the 1967 Smithsonian Folklife Festival.
On June 10, 1996, Indian plaintiffs including Elouise P. Cobell, Mildred Cleghorn, Thomas Maulson and James Louis Larose, filed a class action lawsuit against the federal government for its failure to properly manage Indian trust assets on behalf of all present and past individual Indian trust beneficiaries.
Mildred Cleghorn did not live to see the results of the lawsuit, which became known as Cobell v. Salazar. It was settled for $3.4 billion in 2009, in the Indians' favor, a week after what would have been Mildred Cleghorn's 99th birthday.

References

External links
 Encyclopedia of Oklahoma History and Culture - Cleghorn, Mildred
Photo of Mildred Cleghorn
Homage to Mildred I. Cleghorn, poem by Pax Riddle
Letters in the Dewey F. Bartlett Collection at the Carl Albert Center

1910 births
1997 deaths
Dollmakers
Artists from Oklahoma
Chiricahua people
Female Native American leaders
20th-century Native American women
20th-century Native Americans
Fort Sill Apache Tribe